Observational comedy is a form of humor based on the commonplace aspects of everyday life. It is one of the main types of humor in stand-up comedy. In an observational comedy act, the comedian makes an observation about something which is common enough to be familiar to their audience, but not commonly discussed. Such observations are typically presented with the phrase "Have you ever noticed...?" or "Did you ever notice...?" which has become a comedy cliché.

Analysis
British comedians Richard Herring and Jo Caulfield wrote in an article that observational comedy relies upon the fact that the observation is "universally familiar" but that it "won't necessarily have been consciously noted by your audience", arguing that the statements can be neither too obvious nor too obscure. Similarly, Eddie Izzard noted that a comedian's observations need to be relatable in order to be successful. Douglas Coupland claims that "it takes a good observational comedian to tell you what, exactly, is the 'deal'" with the phenomenon they are observing, and describes ideal topics for observational comedy as "those banalities and fragments of minutiae lurking just below the threshold of perception".

Observational comedy has been compared to sociology.

History
Although observational comedy became popular in the United States in the 1950s, one author suggests that even much older jokes commented on human nature in comparable ways. Shelley Berman was one of the pioneers in the field. Other influential observational comics include David Brenner, George Carlin, and Jerry Seinfeld. A 1989 Los Angeles Times article wrote that Seinfeld is "clearly the standard of excellence in observational comedy", while Judd Apatow called Seinfeld "the greatest observational comedian who ever lived".

The British observational comedy tradition began with the Irish comedian Dave Allen's performances in the early 1970s. More recently, James Acaster has developed a form of "uber-trivial" observational comedy, which has been described as a spoof of the traditional observational form.

References

Comedy genres
Observation
Stand-up comedy